Basement Jams is the third studio album by Tom Green. It was released in 2008 in download only format on his website tomgreen.com.

Track listing
"My Introduction"
"All She Wrote"
"Show You How"
"Dangerous"
"Such a Rush"
"Bobbin' to the Right"
"Focus"
"Rap Overdose"
"Sound So Wack"
"State of Emergency"
"Bum Bum 2007"
"Losin' It"

External links
Album Store

Tom Green albums
2008 albums
Self-released albums